Kendirli is a town (belde) in the Rize District, Rize Province, Turkey. Its population is 3,088 (2021).

References

Populated places in Rize District